Dorothea Helen Puente (January 9, 1929 – March 27, 2011) was an American convicted serial killer. In the 1980s, she ran a boarding house in Sacramento, California, and murdered various elderly and mentally disabled boarders before cashing their Social Security checks. Puente's total count reached nine murders; she was convicted of three and the jury hung on the other six. Newspapers dubbed Puente the "Death House Landlady".

Background 

Puente was born Dorothea Helen Gray on January 9, 1929, in Redlands, California, to Trudy Mae and Jesse James Gray. Her parents were both alcoholics and her father repeatedly threatened to commit suicide in front of his children. Her father died of tuberculosis in 1937; her mother, who worked as a sex worker, lost custody of her children in 1938 and died in a motorcycle accident by the end of the year. Puente and her siblings were subsequently sent to an orphanage, where she was sexually abused.

Gray's first marriage at age sixteen, in 1945, was to a soldier named Fred McFaul, who had just returned from the Pacific theater of World War II. They had two daughters between 1946 and 1948; Gray sent one child to live with relatives in Sacramento, and placed the other for adoption. She also suffered a miscarriage. McFaul left her in late 1948.

In the spring of 1948, Gray was arrested for purchasing women's accessories using forged checks in Riverside. She pled guilty to two counts of forgery, serving four months in jail and three years' probation. Six months after her release, she left Riverside.

In 1952, Gray married merchant seaman Axel Bren Johansson in San Francisco. She created a fake persona, calling herself "Teya Singoalla Neyaarda", a Muslim woman of Egyptian and Israeli descent. They had a turbulent marriage; Gray took advantage of Johansson's frequent trips to sea by inviting men to their home and gambling away his money.

Gray was arrested in 1960 for owning and operating a bookkeeping firm as a front for a  brothel in Sacramento; she was found guilty and was sentenced to ninety days in the Sacramento County Jail. In 1961, Johansson had Gray briefly committed to DeWitt State Hospital after a binge of drinking, lying, criminal behavior, and suicide attempts. While there, doctors diagnosed her as a pathological liar with an unstable personality.

Gray and Johansson divorced in 1966, although she continued to use Johansson's name for some time following their separation. Gray assumed the identity of "Sharon Johansson", hiding her delinquent behavior by portraying herself as a devout Christian woman. She established her reputation as a caregiver, providing young women with a sanctuary from poverty and abuse without charge.

In 1968, Gray married Roberto Jose Puente. After sixteen months, the couple separated, with Gray citing domestic abuse. In 1967, she attempted to serve him with a divorce petition , but Puente fled to Mexico; the divorce wouldn't be finalized until 1973. The two would continue to have a turbulent relationship, and Gray filed a restraining order in 1975. Gray would continue to use the surname Puente for more than twenty years.

Following her divorce, Gray focused on running a boarding house located at 21st and F streets in Sacramento. She established herself as a genuine resource to the community to aid alcoholics, homeless people, and mentally ill people by holding Alcoholics Anonymous meetings and assisting individuals to sign up to receive Social Security benefits. She changed her public image to that of a respectable older matron by putting on vintage clothing, wearing large granny glasses, and letting her hair turn gray. She also established herself as a respected member in Sacramento's Hispanic community, funding charities, scholarships, and radio programs. She eventually met and married Pedro Angel Montalvo, though Montalvo abruptly left the relationship a week after their marriage.

In 1978, Gray was charged and convicted of illegally cashing thirty-four state and federal checks that belonged to her tenants. She was given five years' probation and ordered to pay $4,000 in restitution.

Murders 
In April 1982, 53-year-old Ruth Munroe began living with Puente in her upstairs apartment, but soon died from an overdose of codeine and acetaminophen. Puente told police that the woman was very depressed because her husband was terminally ill. The authorities left the cause of death as undetermined, since there was such an excessive amount of both these drugs, and she was bedridden at the time.

A few weeks later, the police returned after Malcolm McKenzie, a 74-year-old pensioner (one of four elderly people Puente was accused of drugging), accused Puente of drugging and stealing from him. On August 18, 1982, Puente was convicted of three theft charges and sentenced to five years in prison; there, she began corresponding with Everson Gillmouth, a 77-year-old retiree from Oregon. A pen pal friendship developed, and when Puente was released in 1985 after serving three years of her five-year sentence, he met her outside the prison, driving a red 1980 Ford pickup. Their relationship developed quickly, and the couple was soon making wedding plans.

In November 1985, Puente hired a man named Ismael Florez to install some wood paneling in her apartment. For his labor and $800, Puente gave him the red Ford pickup, which she stated belonged to her boyfriend in Los Angeles, who no longer needed it. She asked Florez to build a 6-by-3-by-2-foot box to store "books and other items". She then asked Florez to transport the filled,  sealed box to a storage depot. Florez agreed, and Puente assisted him.

Puente told Florez to stop while they were on Garden Highway in Sutter County and dump the box of "junk" on the riverbank at an unofficial household junk dumping site. On January 1, 1986, a fisherman spotted the suspicious looking coffin-like box near the river and called police. Investigators opened the box and found the badly decomposed and unidentifiable body of an elderly man inside. Puente continued to collect Gillmouth's pension and wrote letters to his family, explaining that the reason he had not contacted them was because he was ill. She continued to maintain a boarding house, taking in forty new tenants. Gillmouth's body remained unidentified for three years.

Puente continued to accept elderly boarders and was popular with local social workers because she accepted referrals of the "tough cases", including drug addicts and abusive tenants. She collected tenants' monthly mail before they saw it and paid them stipends, pocketing the rest for "expenses". During this period, parole agents visited Puente at least fifteen times; though she had been ordered to keep away from the elderly and refrain from handling government checks, no violations were ever noted.

Suspicion was first aroused when neighbors noticed the odd activities of a homeless alcoholic known only as "Chief", whom Puente stated she had "adopted" and hired as her handyman. Puente had Chief dig in the basement and cart soil and rubbish away in a wheelbarrow. At the time, the basement floor was covered with a concrete slab. Chief later dismantled a garage in the backyard and installed a fresh concrete slab there as well. Soon afterward, Chief disappeared.

Arrest and imprisonment 

On November 11, 1988, police inquired after the disappearance of tenant Alvaro "Bert" Montoya, a developmentally disabled man with schizophrenia, who had been reported missing by his social worker. After noticing disturbed soil on the property, they uncovered the body of tenant Leona Carpenter, 78. Seven bodies were eventually found buried on the property.

Puente was charged with a total of nine murders: Puente's boyfriend, Everson Gillmouth, 77; and eight tenants who lived at the boarding house: Ruth Munroe, 61; Leona Carpenter, 78; Alvaro "Bert/Alberto" Gonzales Montoya, 51; Dorothy Miller, 64; Benjamin Fink, 55; James Gallop, 62; Vera Faye Martin, 64; and Betty Palmer, 78. According to investigators, most of her victims had been drugged until they overdosed; Puente then wrapped them in bed-sheets and plastic lining before dragging them to open pits in the backyard for burial.

During the initial investigation, Puente was not immediately a suspect, and she was allowed to leave the property, ostensibly to buy a cup of coffee at a nearby hotel. Instead, after buying the coffee, she fled immediately to Los Angeles, where she befriended an elderly male pensioner whom she had met in a bar. Unbeknownst to Puente, the pensioner recognized her as the woman he saw on television news reports. The pensioner contacted local law enforcement who then quickly arrested Puente.

Granting a change of venue motion filed by Puente's lawyers, Kevin Clymo and Peter Vlautin III, a judge transferred the trial to Monterey County. Trial began in October 1992 and ended a year later. The prosecutor, John O'Mara, was the homicide supervisor in the Sacramento County District Attorney's office.

O'Mara called over 130 witnesses; he argued to the jury that Puente had used sleeping pills to put her tenants to sleep, then suffocated them, and hired convicts to dig the holes in her yard. Clymo concluded his closing argument by showing a picture commonly used in psychology that can be viewed in different ways and saying "Keep in mind things are not always as they seem." The jury deliberated over a month and eventually found Puente guilty of three murders. The jury was deadlocked eleven to one for conviction on all counts, and the lone holdout finally agreed to a conviction of two first-degree murder counts, including special circumstances, and one second-degree murder count. The penalty phase of the prosecution was highlighted by her prior convictions introduced by O'Mara.

The defense called several witnesses, who showed Puente had a generous and caring side to her. Witnesses, including her long-lost daughter, testified how Puente had helped them in their youth and guided them to successful careers. Mental health experts testified of Puente's abusive upbringing and how it motivated her to help the less fortunate. At the same time, they agreed she had an evil side brought on by the stress of caring for her down-and-out tenants.

O'Mara's closing argument focused on Puente's acts of murder:Does anyone become responsible for their conduct in this world? ... These people were human beings, they had a right to live-they did not have a lot of possessions-no houses-no cars-only their social security checks and their lives. She took it all... Death is the only appropriate penalty.

Clymo responded by evoking Dorothea the child and caregiver. Peter Vlautin addressed the jurors in confidential tones, contrasting with O'Mara's shouting:We are here today to determine one thing: What is the value of Dorothea Puente's life? That is the question. Does she have to be killed?" Vlautin spoke gently about Puente's childhood touching on the traumatic aspects that shaped her life and urged the jurors to see the world through her eyes. "You have heard of the despair which was the foundation of her life, the anger and resentment...If anyone in the jury room tells you it was not that bad, ask them would you want that to happen to yourself? Would you want that to happen to your children? ... I am led to believe if there is any reason for us to be living here on this Earth, it is to somehow enhance one another's humanity, to love, to touch each other with kindness, to know that you have made just one person breathe easier because you have lived. I submit to you ladies and gentlemen that is why these people came to testify for Dorothea Puente ... I think you can only truly understand why so many people testified and asked you to spare Dorothea's life only if you have ever fallen down and stumbled on the road of life and had someone pick you up, give you comfort, give you love, show you the way. Then you will understand why these people believe Dorothea's life is worth saving. That is mitigating. That is a human quality that deserves to be preserved. It is a flame of humanity that has burned inside Dorothea since she was young ... That is reason to give Dorothea Puente life without the possibility of parole.

Conviction 
Puente was convicted of three of the murders, although the jury could not agree on the other six. After several days of deliberations, the jury was deadlocked 7–5; Judge Michael J. Virga declared a mistrial when the jury said further deliberations would not change their minds. Under the law, Puente received life without the possibility of parole. She was incarcerated at Central California Women's Facility (CCWF) in Chowchilla, California. For the rest of her life, she maintained her innocence, insisting that all of her boarders had died of "natural causes".

Death 
Puente died in prison at Chowchilla on March 27, 2011, from natural causes; she was 82.

Media 
Puente has been featured on numerous true crime television shows, including Crime Stories, Deadly Women, A Stranger in My Home, World's Most Evil Killers, and Worst Roommate Ever.

The 1991 film Evil Spirits, starring Karen Black and Arte Johnson, is loosely based on the Puente murders.

In 1998, Puente began corresponding with Shane Bugbee. The result was Cooking with a Serial Killer (2004), which included a lengthy interview, almost fifty recipes, and various pieces of prison art sent to Bugbee by the convicted murderer. Jodi Picoult mentions Puente's crimes and cookbook in her novel House Rules.

The boarding house at 1426 F Street in Sacramento was included in the 2013 home tour held by the Sacramento Old City Association. It was then the subject of the 2015 documentary short The House Is Innocent and was again opened to tours for one day in conjunction with a local film festival's showing of the film.

In 2015, the Ghost Adventures crew investigated the house, due to reports of hauntings by the victims and Puente herself.

In April 2020, the house and current owners were showcased in the Quibi series Murder House Flip.

In June 2020, the house was featured in a ten-minute documentary with 60 Second Docs about the purchase and renovation of the house by the current owners.

A well-researched play by Mark Loewenstern entitled "Dorothea Puente Tells All!" has sold out to audiences at the California Stage, Wilkerson Theatre, UC Davis, and in January 2023 at Saramento Theatre Company.

See also 
 List of serial killers in the United States
 List of serial killers by number of victims

References

Further reading 
 
Green, Ryan (2019). Buried Beneath the Boarding House: A Shocking True Story of Deception, Exploitation and Murder. Independently published. ISBN 978-1-69508-557-2.

 
 
 Stone, Michael H., M.D. & Brucato, Gary, Ph.D., The New Evil: Understanding the Emergence of Modern Violent Crime (Amherst, N.Y.: Prometheus Books), pp. 104-107.

External links 
 
 —KRON-TV news report about the initial investigation

1929 births
1976 murders in the United States
1982 murders in the United States
1988 murders in the United States
2011 deaths
American confidence tricksters
American female serial killers
American people convicted of fraud
American people convicted of murder
American people convicted of theft
American prisoners sentenced to life imprisonment
Forgers
Fugitives
People convicted of murder by California
People from Sacramento, California
Poisoners
Prisoners sentenced to life imprisonment by California
Serial killers who died in prison custody